The Vero Beach Devil Rays, originally the Vero Beach Dodgers, were a minor league baseball team based in Vero Beach, Florida. They played in the Class A-Advanced Florida State League from 1980–2008, at which point they relocated to Port Charlotte, Florida as the Charlotte Stone Crabs. They played their home games at Holman Stadium.

As their names imply, Vero Beach was affiliated with two different Major League Baseball teams during their existence: the Los Angeles Dodgers from 1980–2006 and the Tampa Bay Devil Rays from 2007–2008. As the Vero Beach Devil Rays, they won the Florida State League championship in 2007.

History
Founded in 1980 as the Vero Beach Dodgers, the team was affiliated with the Los Angeles Dodgers Major League Baseball team from 1980–2006. They played their home games at Holman Stadium, which had served as Los Angeles' spring training facility since 1953.

In 2007 the franchise's affiliation changed to the Tampa Bay Devil Rays; they were then renamed the Vero Beach Devil Rays. After the 2008 season Tampa Bay moved their Class A-Advanced affiliate to Port Charlotte, where they became known as the Charlotte Stone Crabs.

History
On August 25, 2008, it was announced that the Vero Beach franchise was sold to Ripken Baseball, which resulted in a relocation of the franchise to Port Charlotte, Florida to become the Charlotte Stone Crabs.

Notable alumni

Hall of Fame alumni

 Mike Piazza (1990) Inducted, 2016

Notable alumni

 Pedro Astacio (1990)-1991) 
Rocco Baldelli (2007–2008)
 Adrian Beltre (1997, 2001) 4 x MLB All-Star
 Chad Billingsley (2004) MLB All-Star
 Pat Borders (2006) 1992 World Series Most Valuable Player
 Sid Bream (1981)
Jonathan Broxton (2004) 2 x MLB All-Star
 Ron Coomer (2003) MLB All-Star
 Alex Cora (1997)
Wade Davis (2007) 3 x MLB All-Star
 Mariano Duncan (1983) MLB All-Star
 Sid Fernandez (1982) 2 x MLB All-Star
 John Franco (1981) 4 x MLB All-Star
 Eric Gagne (1998) 3 x MLB All-Star; 2003 NL Cy Young Award
Matt Garza (2008)
 Juan Guzman (1986) MLB All-Star
 Matt Herges (1994)
 Darren Holmes (1986)
 Jay Howell (1992) 3 x MLB All-Star
Todd Hundley (2003) 2 x MLB All-Star
Scott Kazmir (2008) 3 x MLB All-Star
Matt Kemp (2004-2005) 2 x MLB All-Star
 Paul Lo Duca (1993, 1996) 4 x MLB All-Star
 James Loney (2002)
Fred McGriff (2003) 5 x MLB All-Star
Russell Martin (2004) 4 x MLB All-Star
 Ramon Martinez (1987, 1996) MLB All-Star
 Jose Offerman (1988) 2 x MLB All-Star
 Alejandro Pena (1986) 1984 NL ERA Leader
Carlos Pena (2008) MLB All-Star
David Price (2008) 5 x MLB All-Star; 2012, 2015 AL ERA Leader; 2012 AL Cy Young Award
Dennys Reyes (1994-1995)
 Dave Roberts (2004 )2016 NL Manager of the Year
 David Ross (1999)
 Steve Sax (1980) 5 x MLB All-Star; 1982 NL Rookie of the Year
 Franklin Stubbs (1982)
 John Tudor (1989)
 Shane Victorino (2001) 2 x MLB All-Star
 Bob Welch (1985) 2 x MLB All-Star; 1990 AL Cy Young Award
 John Wetteland (1987) 3 x MLB All-Star
Wesley Wright
 Eric Young (1990) MLB All-Star
Ben Zobrist (2008) 3 x MLB All-Star; 2016 World Series Most Valuable Player

Website
http://www.vbdrays.com/

Defunct Florida State League teams
Los Angeles Dodgers minor league affiliates
Tampa Bay Devil Rays minor league affiliates
Defunct baseball teams in Florida
1980 establishments in Florida
2008 disestablishments in Florida
Baseball teams established in 1980
Baseball teams disestablished in 2008
Vero Beach, Florida